Major David Auldjo Jamieson,  (1 October 1920 – 5 May 2001) was a British Army officer in the Second World War who received the Victoria Cross, the highest award for gallantry in the face of the enemy that can be awarded to British and Commonwealth forces.

Early life
David Auldjo Jamieson was born in Westminster on 1 October 1920, the elder son of Sir Archibald Auldjo Jamieson, Chairman of Vickers Armstrong. He attended Ladycross School, Seaford, East Sussex, and Eton College. In his youth he spent time at the family holiday retreat in Norfolk. He was a volunteer in the Territorial Army unit at Dersingham for the 5th Battalion, Royal Norfolk Regiment, which he joined in May 1939 when the Territorial Army was doubled in size. He was transferred to the 7th Battalion, formed as a 2nd Line duplicate of the 5th, and was subsequently commissioned as a second lieutenant, despite a lack of experience.

Second World War
Aged 19 on the outbreak of the Second World War, Jamieson was considered too young for overseas service and did not initially go with the battalion, now part of the 51st (Highland) Infantry Division, to join the British Expeditionary Force (BEF) when it went to France in 1940 but followed later. When the majority of the battalion was captured in June 1940 during the Fall of France he was at Rouen and was able to return to Britain. The battalion was reformed in 1941 and he was promoted to a company commander of D Company.

Victoria Cross
Jamieson was a 23-year-old captain in the 7th Battalion of the Royal Norfolk Regiment, now part of the 176th Infantry Brigade attached to the 59th (Staffordshire) Infantry Division, when the following deed took place for which he was awarded the Victoria Cross. On 7/8 August 1944, south of Grimbosq, Normandy, France, Jamieson was in command of D Company, being the only officer remaining, which had established a bridgehead over the River Orne. The enemy made seven counter-attacks on the company's position, but throughout 36 hours of bitter and close fighting Captain Jamieson's company refused to give up. The attacks included assaults with Tiger and Panther tanks which shot up the Royal Norfolks' tanks. Jamieson at one point mounted a British tank to talk to the commander under enemy fire. He dismissed it as anything heroic, saying that he had to as the telephone didn't work – tanks were equipped with an external handset so that the commander could talk to an infantry commander without opening the hatch. The image of Captain Jamieson riding a Churchill tank while enemy tanks attacked was immortalised in a painting.

The citation for Captain David Jamieson in the London Gazette of 26 October 1944 ends:

Post-war
Following the war, he worked for the Australian Agricultural Company, which ran several sheep and cattle stations; he became a director in 1949 and was Governor from 1951 to 1975. He was also director of other companies including National Westminster Bank.  Due to his height, 6 ft 5, he was designated the ceremonial umbrella man to Queen Elizabeth, the Queen Mother, carrying an umbrella over her at social functions.

In 1948 he married Nancy Elwes, who died in a car accident in 1963. He remarried, to Joanna Windsor-Clive, in 1969. He was appointed High Sheriff of Norfolk in 1979.

He died on 5 May 2001 in Burnham Market, Norfolk, and was interred in the churchyard in Burnham Norton. He was survived by his widow, his son Andrew Jamieson, and two daughters of his first marriage, three grandchildren, and by a stepson and stepdaughter.

Medals
David Jamieson's Victoria Cross is displayed in the Royal Norfolk Regimental Museum in Norwich Castle.

Jamieson was awarded the following service and commemorative medals: 
1939–45 Star
France and Germany Star
Defence Medal
War Medal
Queen Elizabeth II Coronation Medal
Queen Elizabeth II Silver Jubilee Medal

References

1920 births
2001 deaths
British Army personnel of World War II
British Army recipients of the Victoria Cross
British World War II recipients of the Victoria Cross
Commanders of the Royal Victorian Order
English people of Scottish descent
High Sheriffs of Norfolk
Honourable Corps of Gentlemen at Arms
People educated at Eton College
People educated at Ladycross School
People from Burnham Market
People from Westminster
Royal Norfolk Regiment officers
Military personnel from London
British Battle of Normandy recipients of the Victoria Cross
Burials in Norfolk